Cassida vittata is a green-coloured beetle from the leaf beetle family, that can be found in Europe.

References

Cassidinae
Beetles of Europe
Beetles described in 1789
Taxa named by Charles Joseph Devillers